The 2005 NASCAR Craftsman Truck Series was the eleventh season of the Craftsman Truck Series, the third highest stock car racing series sanctioned by NASCAR in the United States. Ted Musgrave of Ultra Motorsports was crowned the season's champion.

A rule change affected the qualification process in 2005.  The top 30 teams in the owners' standings at the end of the 2004 season saw their drivers qualify automatically for the first four races of the season, provided they attempted all races in the previous year.  However, only 29 teams met the criteria, so at the start of the season, one additional spot was available for the remaining teams on the entry list.  After the fourth race, current standings were used to determine the teams guaranteed to have their drivers in the field.

2005 teams and drivers

Full-time teams

Part-time teams
Note: If under "team", the owner's name is listed and in italics, that means the name of the race team that fielded the truck is unknown.

Notes

Races

Florida Dodge Dealers 250

The Florida Dodge Dealers 250 was held February 18 at Daytona International Speedway. Kerry Earnhardt won the pole.

Top ten results

04-Bobby Hamilton
2-Jimmy Spencer
66-Todd Bodine
99-Ricky Craven
1-Ted Musgrave
08-Ken Weaver
29-Brad Keselowski
75-David Starr
24-Wayne Edwards
23-Johnny Benson

Failed to qualify: J. R. Patton (No. 63), Rick Markle (No. 45), David Ragan (No. 28), Jason Rudd (No. 31), Derrike Cope (No. 48), Mike Wallace (No. 52)

American Racing Wheels 200

The American Racing Wheels 200 was held February 25 at California Speedway. Mike Skinner won the pole.

Top ten results

62-Steve Park
04-Bobby Hamilton
99-Ricky Craven
50-Todd Kluever
1-Ted Musgrave
88-Matt Crafton
2-Jimmy Spencer
6-Ron Hornaday Jr.
12-Robert Huffman
46-Dennis Setzer

Failed to qualify: Derrike Cope (No. 48), Jason Rudd (No. 31)

Park's victory made him the second driver in 2005 to complete the NASCAR Triple Threat, as he had yet to win in the Truck Series.

World Financial Group 200

The World Financial Group 200 was held March 18 at Atlanta Motor Speedway. Rick Crawford won the pole.

Top ten results

6-Ron Hornaday Jr.
47-Bobby Labonte
04-Bobby Hamilton
46-Dennis Setzer
75-David Starr
1-Ted Musgrave
30-Chad Chaffin
16-Jack Sprague
10-Terry Cook
12-Robert Huffman

Failed to qualify: Regan Smith (No. 19), Derrike Cope (No. 48), Brendan Gaughan (No. 77), Steve Grissom (No. 31)

Kroger 250

The Kroger 250 was held April 9 at Martinsville Speedway. Bobby Hamilton won the pole.

Top ten results

47-Bobby Labonte
99-Ricky Craven
6-Ron Hornaday Jr.
66-Todd Bodine
30-Chad Chaffin
15-Shane Hmiel
1-Ted Musgrave
2-Jimmy Spencer
5-Mike Skinner
10-Terry Cook

Failed to qualify: Brendan Gaughan (No. 77), Darrell Waltrip (No. 11), Shigeaki Hattori (No. 9), Eric King (No. 00), Nick Tucker (No. 31), Justin Allgaier (No. 63), Joey McCarthy (No. 48), Bill Manfull (No. 32)

Labonte's victory made him the fourth driver in 2005 to become a winner in all three of NASCAR's top series.

Dodge Ram Tough 200

The Dodge Ram Tough 200 was held April 30 at Gateway International Raceway. Ted Musgrave won the pole.

Top ten results

1-Ted Musgrave
46-Dennis Setzer
2-Jimmy Spencer
5-Mike Skinner
14-Rick Crawford
04-Bobby Hamilton
66-Todd Bodine
59-Robert Pressley
30-Chad Chaffin
99-Ricky Craven

Failed to qualify: Shane Wallace (No. 21), Brandon Bendele (No. 24), Justin Allgaier (No. 63), Eric Norris (No. 48), J. C. Stout (No. 91)

UAW-GM Ohio 250

The UAW-GM Ohio 250 was held May 15 at Mansfield Motorsports Speedway. Ron Hornaday Jr. won the pole.

Top ten results

04-Bobby Hamilton
16-Jack Sprague
15-Shane Hmiel
50-Todd Kluever
08-Rich Bickle
14-Rick Crawford
46-Dennis Setzer
99-Ricky Craven
75-David Starr
07-Butch Miller

Failed to qualify: Mike Osgar (No. 48), Frank Wilson Jr. (No. 31), Sam Beam (No. 64), Blake Mallory (No. 21), Jim Walker (No. 74), Kelly Thacker (No. 68)

 This was Hamilton's last career NASCAR victory.

Quaker Steak & Lube 200

The Quaker Steak & Lube 200 presented by Click It or Ticket was held May 20 at Lowe's Motor Speedway. Mike Skinner won the pole.

Top ten results

15-Kyle Busch
10-Terry Cook
1-Ted Musgrave
23-Johnny Benson
62-Steve Park
22-Bill Lester
46-Dennis Setzer
77-Brendan Gaughan
88-Matt Crafton
99-Ricky Craven

Failed to qualify: Jimmy Kite (No. 06), Deborah Renshaw (No. 8), Nick Tucker (No. 31), David Ragan (No. 28), Wayne Edwards (No. 24), Mike Harmon (No. 21)

This was Busch's first career Craftsman Truck Series victory.

MBNA RacePoints 200

The MBNA RacePoints 200 was held June 4 at Dover International Speedway. David Starr won the pole.

Top ten results

15-Kyle Busch
47-Tony Stewart
10-Terry Cook
6-Ron Hornaday Jr.
17-David Reutimann
4-Timothy Peters
99-Ricky Craven
75-David Starr
88-Matt Crafton
5-Mike Skinner

Failed to qualify: none

Chex 400k

The Chex 400k was held June 10 at Texas Motor Speedway. Mike Skinner won the pole.

Top ten results

16-Jack Sprague
23-Johnny Benson
46-Dennis Setzer
5-Mike Skinner
88-Matt Crafton
6-Ron Hornaday Jr.
10-Terry Cook
65-Clay Rogers
75-David Starr
17-David Reutimann

Failed to qualify: none

Paramount Health Insurance 200

The Paramount Health Insurance 200 was held June 18 at Michigan International Speedway. Kyle Busch won the pole.

Top ten results

46-Dennis Setzer
15-Kyle Busch
04-Bobby Hamilton
92-Kevin Harvick
5-Mike Skinner
14-Rick Crawford
30-Chad Chaffin
17-David Reutimann
66-Todd Bodine
16-Jack Sprague

Failed to qualify: Kelly Sutton (No. 02), Blake Mallory (No. 24)

Toyota Tundra Milwaukee 200

The Toyota Tundra Milwaukee 200 was held June 24 at The Milwaukee Mile. Jack Sprague won the pole.

Top ten results

46-Dennis Setzer
16-Jack Sprague
1-Ted Musgrave
6-Ron Hornaday Jr.
77-Brendan Gaughan
04-Bobby Hamilton
62-Steve Park
14-Rick Crawford
50-Todd Kluever
10-Terry Cook

Failed to qualify: Brandon Bendele (No. 24), Kelly Sutton (No. 02), Shigeaki Hattori (No. 9), Tom Powers (No. 89)

O'Reilly Auto Parts 250

The O'Reilly Auto Parts 250 was held July 2 at Kansas Speedway. Bill Lester won the pole. During the race, Kelly Sutton flipped.

Top ten results

30-Todd Bodine
50-Todd Kluever
17-David Reutimann
5-Mike Skinner
22-Bill Lester
2-Jimmy Spencer
10-Terry Cook
77-Brendan Gaughan
15-John Andretti
14-Rick Crawford

Failed to qualify: none

Built Ford Tough 225

The Built Ford Tough 225 pres. by Greater Cincinnati Ford Dealers was held July 9 at Kentucky Speedway. Bill Lester won the pole.

Top ten results

46-Dennis Setzer
30-Todd Bodine
17-David Reutimann
5-Mike Skinner
1-Ted Musgrave
38-Brandon Whitt
88-Matt Crafton
62-Steve Park
23-Johnny Benson
75-David Starr

Failed to qualify: Justin Allgaier (No. 63), Blake Mallory (No. 76)

O'Reilly 200 presented by Valvoline

The O'Reilly 200 presented by Valvoline was held July 23 at Memphis Motorsports Park. Brandon Whitt won the pole.

Top ten results

38-Brandon Whitt
17-David Reutimann
77-Brendan Gaughan
46-Dennis Setzer
75-David Starr
04-Bobby Hamilton
88-Matt Crafton
15-John Andretti
23-Johnny Benson
50-Todd Kluever

 Ron Hornaday Jr. led coming off through the final two corners, but a wreck had occurred leaving smoke on the track. Hornaday slowed down and Whitt got into the back of Hornaday, spinning Hornaday's No. 6 truck around. Hornaday finished 21st.

Failed to qualify: Justin Allgaier (No. 63), Jim Walker (No. 74), Sam Beam (No. 64), Frank Wilson Jr. (No. 27)

Power Stroke Diesel 200

The Power Stroke Diesel 200 was held on August 5 at Indianapolis Raceway Park. Dennis Setzer won the pole.

Top ten results

46-Dennis Setzer
50-Todd Kluever
6-Ron Hornaday Jr.
88-Matt Crafton
2-Jimmy Spencer
14-Rick Crawford
59-Robert Pressley
77-Brendan Gaughan
16-Jack Sprague
47-Aric Almirola

Failed to qualify: Clay Rogers (No. 44), Frank Wilson Jr. (No. 27), Bobby East (No. 33), Johnny Sauter (No. 43), Michael Faulk (No. 53), Casey Kingsland (No. 91)

Matt Crafton suffered a 25-point penalty for an unapproved adjustment to his truck.

Toyota Tundra 200

The Toyota Tundra 200 was held on August 13 at Nashville Superspeedway. Mike Skinner won the pole.

Top ten results

17-David Reutimann
1-Ted Musgrave
30-Todd Bodine
5-Mike Skinner
50-Todd Kluever
77-Brendan Gaughan
22-Bill Lester
23-Johnny Benson
04-Bobby Hamilton
14-Rick Crawford

Failed to qualify: Roland Isaacs (No. 24), Wayne Edwards (No. 68)

O'Reilly 200 presented by Valvoline

The O'Reilly 200 presented by Valvoline Maxlife was held on August 24 at Bristol Motor Speedway. David Reutimann won the pole.

Top ten results

5-Mike Skinner
30-Todd Bodine
16-Jack Sprague
23-Johnny Benson
15-Kyle Busch
1-Ted Musgrave
2-Jimmy Spencer
75-David Starr
12-Mike Wallace
52-Ken Schrader

Failed to qualify: Wayne Edwards (No. 24), Kelly Sutton (No. 02), Tam Topham (No. 70), Casey Kingsland (No. 91), Eric King (No. 00), Frank Wilson Jr. (No. 27)

 Mike Skinner won his first race since returning to the Craftsman Truck Series after spending 1997 to 2003 on the NEXTEL Cup circuit.

Cheerios Betty Crocker 200

The Cheerios Betty Crocker 200 was held on September 8 at Richmond International Raceway.  David Starr won the pole.

Top ten results

5-Mike Skinner
30-Todd Bodine
92-Kevin Harvick
1-Ted Musgrave
13-Tracy Hines
12-Mike Wallace
88-Matt Crafton
59-Robert Pressley
2-Jimmy Spencer
6-Ron Hornaday Jr.

Failed to qualify: Tony Stewart (No. 92), Bobby East (No. 33), Ronnie Hornaday (No. 7), Mike Bliss (No. 06), Andy Houston (No. 40), Tam Topham (No. 70), Kelly Sutton (No. 02), Robbie Ferguson (No. 24), Craig Wood (No. 73)

Sylvania 200 presented by Lowe's

The Sylvania 200 presented by Lowe's was held on September 17 at New Hampshire International Speedway. Matt Crafton won the pole.

Top ten results

14-Rick Crawford
46-Dennis Setzer
1-Ted Musgrave
65-Clay Rogers
6-Ron Hornaday Jr.
2-Jimmy Spencer
15-Kyle Busch
47-Aric Almirola
60-Chad Chaffin
77-Brendan Gaughan

Failed to qualify: Frank Wilson Jr. (No. 27), J. C. Stout (No. 91)

Las Vegas 350

The Las Vegas 350 was held September 24 at Las Vegas Motor Speedway. Mike Skinner won the pole.

Top ten results

30-Todd Bodine
1-Ted Musgrave
75-David Starr
16-Jack Sprague
04-Bobby Hamilton
5-Mike Skinner
14-Rick Crawford
50-Todd Kluever
38-Brandon Whitt
65-Tim Fedewa

Failed to qualify: none

Kroger 200

The Kroger 200 was held October 22 at Martinsville Speedway. Rick Crawford won the pole.

Top ten results

99-Ricky Craven
50-Todd Kluever
38-Brandon Whitt
1-Ted Musgrave
15-Kyle Busch
47-Willie Allen
10-Terry Cook
4-Timothy Peters
6-Ron Hornaday Jr.
30-Todd Bodine

Failed to qualify: Kelly Sutton (No. 02), Frank Wilson Jr. (No. 27)

By recording the victory, Craven became the seventh and final driver in 2005 to have won a race in all three of NASCAR's top series in his career, needing only a Truck Series victory to complete the trifecta.

EasyCare Vehicle Service Contracts 200

The EasyCare Vehicle Service Contracts 200 was held October 29 at Atlanta Motor Speedway. Mike Skinner won the pole,

Top ten results

15-Kyle Busch
30-Todd Bodine
23-Johnny Benson
60-Jack Sprague
47-Bobby Labonte
50-Todd Kluever
04-Bobby Hamilton
38-Brandon Whitt
99-Ricky Craven
12-Joey Miller

Failed to qualify: John Mickel (No. 05), Kelly Sutton (No. 02), Justin Hobgood (No. 9), Clay Rogers (No. 44), Mark McFarland (No. 52), Wayne Edwards (No. 24)

Silverado 350K

The Silverado 350K was held November 4 at Texas Motor Speedway. Mike Skinner won the pole.

Top ten results

30-Todd Bodine
5-Mike Skinner
15-Kyle Busch
75-David Starr
17-David Reutimann
16-Jack Sprague
6-Ron Hornaday Jr.
04-Bobby Hamilton
50-Todd Kluever

Failed to qualify: Kelly Sutton (No. 02), Tim Fedewa (No. 65), Justin Hobgood (No. 9), Blake Mallory (No. 76), Wayne Edwards (No. 24)

Chevy Silverado 150

The Chevy Silverado 150 was held November 11 at Phoenix International Raceway. Brandon Whitt won the pole.

Top ten results

30-Todd Bodine
6-Ron Hornaday Jr.
23-Johnny Benson
14-Rick Crawford
46-Dennis Setzer
1-Ted Musgrave
17-David Reutimann
88-Matt Crafton
5-Mike Skinner
16-Mike Bliss

Failed to qualify: Frank Wilson Jr. (No. 27), Kelly Sutton (No. 02)

Ford 200

The Ford 200 was held November 19 at Homestead-Miami Speedway due to rain. David Reutimann won the pole.

Top ten results

30-Todd Bodine
60-Jack Sprague
23-Johnny Benson
26-Mike Bliss
22-Bill Lester
15-Kyle Busch
50-Todd Kluever
33-Mark Martin
6-Ron Hornaday Jr.
88-Matt Crafton

Failed to qualify: Tim Fedewa (No. 65), Justin Allgaier (No. 63), Kelly Sutton (No. 02), Wayne Edwards (No. 24), Bobby East (No. 21)

Ted Musgrave officially clinched the championship in this race. It was the final race for his team, Ultra Motorsports.

Full Drivers' Championship

(key) Bold – Pole position awarded by time. Italics – Pole position set by owner's points. * – Most laps led.

Rookie of the Year
The 2005 NASCAR Craftsman Truck Series Rookie of the Year battle was virtually one-sided, as Todd Kluever of Roush Racing was the only candidate to attempt a full schedule, and he posted twelve top-tens, and three second-place finishes. Timothy Peters and Shigeaki Hattori were the only other drivers to fulfill the Rookie of the Year Award's requirement that drivers compete in at least eight of the first 20 races to be eligible. Peters had two top-tens, while Hattori struggled and was released from Germain Racing. Regan Smith was the only other rookie to run more than ten races, as Clay Rogers, Nick Tucker, Jimmy Kite, and Kerry Earnhardt saw their seasons end early.

See also 
 2005 NASCAR Nextel Cup Series
 2005 NASCAR Busch Series

References

External links
Truck Series Standings and Statistics for 2005

NASCAR Truck Series seasons